"I Will Remember You" is a song from Amy Grant's twelfth album, Heart in Motion. The single was a remixed version of the original album track. A&M Records put the remix in lead position on a three-track promotional CD single it released in March 1992, which it followed with a promotional music video.

"I Will Remember You" became Heart in Motion's first release to fail to achieve top 10 status on the Billboard Hot 100, peaking at number 20.

Personnel 
 Amy Grant – vocals 
 Michael Omartian – keyboards, drum sequencing
 Dann Huff – guitars

Charts

Weekly charts

Year-end charts

References

Amy Grant songs
1992 singles
Songs written by Amy Grant
Songs written by Keith Thomas (record producer)
Songs written by Gary Chapman (musician)
1991 songs
A&M Records singles